Lafoensia is a genus of plant in family Lythraceae. It contains the following species (but this list may be incomplete):
Lafoensia glyptocarpa
Lafoensia pacari  St.-Hil.
Lafoensia punicifolia  DC.
Lafoensia replicata  Pohl
Lafoensia speciosa  DC.

References

External links
 
 

 
Lythraceae genera
Taxonomy articles created by Polbot